Reshma Kewalramani, is the president and chief executive officer of Vertex Pharmaceuticals, a biotechnology company based in Boston, Massachusetts, as of April 1, 2020. She is the first female CEO of a large US biotech company. She was previously the chief medical officer and vice president of global medicines development and medical affairs at Vertex.

Early life and education 
Kewalramani was born in Bombay, India. She and her family immigrated to the US when she was 11 years old.

She graduated in 1998 from the seven-year liberal arts/medical education program at Boston University, Phi Beta Kappa, Summa Cum Laude. She finished her internship and residency at the Massachusetts General Hospital and her fellowship in nephrology at the Massachusetts General Hospital and Brigham and Women's Hospital combined program.  After finishing her fellowship in clinical nephrology she did research in transplantation. She graduated from the General Management Program at Harvard Business School in 2015.

Career 
Kewalramani began her career as a physician at Massachusetts General Hospital and Brigham and Women's Hospital. She was also a physician at the Massachusetts Eye and Ear Infirmary and the Massachusetts Institute of Technology. She then entered the biopharma sector, working for Amgen for over 12 years, where she held leadership positions in research and development. In 2017 she joined Vertex Pharmaceuticals. She assumed the role of president and CEO on April 1, 2020 and is a member of the Vertex Board of Directors.

Since she became CEO, Vertex has developed cystic fibrosis therapy drug Trikafta, APOL1-mediated kidney disease experimental apolipoprotein L1 inhibitor, VX-147, and pain programs into the clinic. The company has also partnered with CRISPR Therapeutics to develop gene-editing therapies for the treatment of sickle cell disease and beta thalassemia.

Boards and awards 
Kewalramani is a member of the Massachusetts General Hospital Board of Trustees, the Biomedical Science Careers Program Board  and the Boston University School of Medicine Dean's Advisory Board.   She is also a member of the board of directors of Ginkgo Bioworks,  and was on the inaugural board of directors of the Kidney Health Initiative.

She is the recipient of the American College of Physicians Associates Council Award, the American Medical Women's Association Janet M. Glasgow Memorial Achievement Citation, and the Harvard Medical School Excellence in Teaching Award. Kewalramani is also a Fellow of the American Society of Nephrology and received board certification in Internal Medicine in 2001 and in Nephrology in 2003.  In 2019, she received the TiE Boston Healthcare Leadership Award, and was named one of Boston Business Journal's Power 50. In 2020, Kewalramani was named to the inaugural Business Leaders List by Indiaspora, Business Insider’s list of 10 people transforming health care,  the PharmaVOICE 100 list of leaders in the life sciences,  and Boston Business Journal’s list of Women Who Mean Business.  In 2021, she was the recipient of the International Institute of New England’s Golden Door Award and was named a New Englander of the Year by the New England Council.  Under her leadership as CEO, Vertex was ranked #2 on The Commonwealth Institute’s Top Women-Led Businesses in Massachusetts in 2021.

Personal life 
Kewalramani lives in Massachusetts, and has twin sons.

References 

American women scientists
American women chief executives
Living people
21st-century women scientists
American technology chief executives
21st-century American businesswomen
21st-century American businesspeople
21st-century American scientists
Indian emigrants to the United States
Year of birth missing (living people)
21st-century American women scientists